Al Rufaa is a neighborhood of Doha, Qatar. In the 2015 population census it was recorded as being in Zone 17 with Old Al Hitmi, which it borders to the east with the boundary being Sheraouh Street.

Geography
Al Rufaa borders the following districts:
Old Al Hitmi to the east, separated by Sheraouh Street.
As Salatah and Al Mirqab to the north, separated by Museum Street.
Old Al Ghanim to the west, separated by Jabr Bin Mohammed Street.
Old Al Ghanim and Umm Ghuwailina to the south, separated by Ras Abu Aboud Street.

Landmarks
The Qatar National Folkloric Troupe and Doha Sports Stadium are headquartered here.

A wedding celebration complex is located in Al Rufaa on Celebration Street. The complex consists of six entrance halls, five ceremonial halls, a gathering room and several corridors.

Gallery

References

Communities in Doha